The 1888 Ayr Burghs by-election was a parliamentary by-election held for the British House of Commons constituency of Ayr Burghs on 15 June 1888. The seat had become vacant when the sitting Liberal Unionist Member of Parliament Richard Frederick Fotheringham Campbell died.

The Liberal candidate, John Sinclair, won the seat in a straight fight with his Liberal Unionist opponent, the Hon Evelyn Ashley.

The result

See also
 List of United Kingdom by-elections (1885–1900)

References

1888 elections in the United Kingdom
1888 in Scotland
1880s elections in Scotland
By-elections to the Parliament of the United Kingdom in Scottish constituencies
June 1888 events